General is the highest officer's rank in Finland. It is held exclusively by the Chief of Defence during peacetime. General is comparable to Ranks of NATO armies officers as OF-9.

Historically, a General's branch of service could be indicated in the rank. Carl Gustaf Emil Mannerheim himself was the other one of the two Generals of Cavalry before his promotion to Field Marshal.

References

See also 
 Field marshal (Finland)
 Finnish military ranks

Military ranks of Finland